Tianshifu is a town in Benxi Manchu Autonomous County, Liaoning Province, Northeast China.

References

Towns in Liaoning
Benxi Manchu Autonomous County